LATV (originally pronounced on-air as from 2007 to 2014 and, since 2014, serving as a backronym for its on-air slogan, "Latino Alternative Television") is an American bilingual broadcast television network, digital publisher and media company owned by LATV Networks, LLC. The network primarily carries original inclusive programming including music, talk and variety series aimed at Hispanic and Latino American teenagers and young adults between the ages of 18 and 55. From early on, LATV has characterized itself for featuring Latin Alternative musicians such as La Ley, Zayra Alvarez, Jaguares, Julieta Venegas, Enrique Bunbury, Ely Guerra, and Aterciopelados on its shows. 

The network is available in many markets via the digital subchannels of broadcast television stations and on select cable providers throughout the United States and Puerto Rico through a local affiliate of the network (via a basic programming tier for main channel affiliates, and digital tiers for subchannel-only affiliates).
Also had a show called the hip-hop show that brought underground hip-hop culture to light.

History

LATV originated in 2001 as a programming format on KJLA (channel 57), an independent television station licensed to Los Angeles suburb of Ventura, California (which signed on in 1990 as KSTV-TV, a Galavisión affiliate), which mainly carried Spanish language programming as well as a limited amount of English language content. The format was an outgrowth of the station's nighttime and weekend programming, which it adopted in July 1998, following its disaffiliation from The WB (done to protect existing affiliate KTLA, after KJLA gained must-carry status on Los Angeles area cable providers); the remainder of the schedule at this time consisted of financial news programming and overnight programming from Shop at Home Network. As Los Angeles's first bilingual television station LATV focused on music in its flagship shows LATV Live and Mex 2 the Max. In 2003 the local network expanded its programming to a 24-hour schedule.

On November 22, 2006, Costa de Oro Television (founding owner of KJLA, which was purchased by the network's founder Walter Ulloa in 1994) announced that it would turn the LATV format into a full-fledged national network with a standardized schedule, resulting in the network becoming a competitor with established Spanish language networks such as Univision, Telemundo and Azteca América; as a result, Costa de Oro Television was subsequently renamed LATV Networks. The national LATV network launched on April 23, 2007, on 16 stations in media markets with heavy Latino/Hispanic populations. On May 22, 2007, LATV signed an affiliation agreement with Entravision Communications to carry the network on stations it owned or managed in 10 markets (including Boston, Denver; Albuquerque, Tampa-St. Petersburg and Washington, D.C.), including five of the 25 largest Hispanic markets in the U.S.

On August 20, 2007, Post-Newsweek Stations (now Graham Media Group) acquired a minority interest in network parent LATV Networks; as part of the acquisition, Post-Newsweek also signed an affiliation agreement to carry LATV on the digital subchannels of its television stations in Houston, Miami, Orlando and San Antonio (the company's stations in Jacksonville and Detroit were later added to the agreement); Post-Newsweek relinquished its interest in the network in 2013 to take general-interest English subchannel networks instead, with LATV moving its affiliations in most of the markets where the company owned stations to other full-power and low-power outlets.

In 2019 Andres Palencia and Bruno Seros-Ulloa assumed leadership of LATV as Co-Executive Directors expanding LATV's capabilities to include digital publishing on LATV.com and digital streaming. 

On August 29, 2022 Entravision Communications announced a strategic partnership with LATV.

Programming

LATV provides general entertainment programming to its affiliated stations weekdays from 9:00 a.m. to 3:00 a.m. and weekends from 1:30 p.m. to 3:00 a.m. Eastern Time, with paid and other brokered programming filling most other timeslots. The network airs a mix of original programs and series produced at LATV Studios located at 2323 Corinth ave. in Los Angeles. The network is fully bilingual and features shows focussing on Latino culture, Latina empowerment and LGBTQ+ Latinos.

Programs aired on the network include Rokamolé (a rock music video series with various Latin rock artists serving as guest hosts), La Casa TV (an hour-long lifestyle series), Locas por el Futbol (a weekly soccer review and discussion series hosted by a six-female panel), Almohadazo el Noti (a non-formal late-night news/talk show, hosted by Fernanda Tapia), En La Zona (an entertainment/talk show), Ponle Play (a daily music video series hosted by Caroline Lau), Las Supér 20 (consisting of two weekend music countdown series respectively featuring pop and Mexican Regional videos), Las Noches del LATV (a rebranded version of the Multimedios Television late-night variety series Las Noches del Fútbol) and Consejo Mundial de Lucha Libre (a weekend lucha libre wrestling series and the network's lone sports program).

Although the majority of LATV's programming is produced in Spanish, the network also carries a limited amount of program content produced either exclusively in English or in both languages including Latino TV, an interview series focusing on Latinos in entertainment, sports and art (similar in format to American Latino TV and LatiNation); and children's programs originally distributed for broadcast syndication by Telco Productions, a production company founded by host/television producer Alex Paen – which air for a half-hour on Sunday through Friday mornings and are intended to meet the three-hour weekly educational content requirements defined by the Federal Communications Commission's Children's Television Act. Since 2014, the network also simulcasts home shopping programming from Shop LC each night from 3:00 to 9:00 a.m. Eastern and Pacific Time, through a time brokerage agreement.

The network does not carry national morning and evening newscasts, nor does it carry first-run daytime programming on weekdays; the network instead carries day-behind encores of its evening and late-night programs as part of its daytime lineup on Monday through Fridays. The network's sole news program is Perspectiva Nacional, a Sunday evening political talk show produced by Entravision Communications (LATV had formerly produced a weeknight-only national newscast called Noticias LATV, which aired from 2010 to July 2012).

Talk/interview/lifestyle shows 
 Glitterbomb w/ Patrick Gomez (2018)
 Get It Girl (2016–present)
 The Zoo (2016–present)
 American Latino TV (2019–present)
 Checkitow (2019–present)
 The Hub on LATV (2019–present)
 LatiNation (2019–present)
 The Q Agenda (2019–present)
 Pinkafe(2020–present)
 Checkitow (2019–present)
 Blacktinidad (2021 - present)
 Shades of Beauty (2022)

Music series 
 LATV en Concierto (2007–present)
 Rokamolé (2012–present)
 Las Supér 20: (2012–present)
 Videos2Go (2015–present)

 News programming 
 Lo Que no Sabias (2014–present)
 Perspectiva Nacional (2013–present)

 Sports programming 
 Consejo Mundial de Lucha Libre (2007–present)
 LATV Fan Nation (2019–present)
 World Class Boxing (2016–present)

 Children's programming 
 Animal Rescue (2013–present)
 Biz Kid$ (2013–present)
 Dragonfly TV (2013–present)
 Dog Tales (2016–present)
 Think Big (2013–present)
 America's Heartland (2016–present)
 Soccer Academy (1999-present)

Former programming

Talk/interview shows
 American Latino TV (2007–2013)

Scripted series
 Ceasar and Chuy (2007–2008)

News programming
 Esto es Insolito (2010–2014)
 Noticias LATV'' (2010–2012)

Affiliates

As of January 2015, LATV's programming is carried on television stations in 37 media markets encompassing 17 states, the District of Columbia and Puerto Rico, covering approximately 37% of the United States (or 42,254,000 households with at least one television set). The majority of its stations receive LATV through affiliation agreements with the network; Los Angeles flagship station KJLA served as the network's sole owned-and-operated station via its ownership by LATV parent LATV Networks until 2018.

See also

 MTV Tres - U.S. Latino version of MTV.
 NBC Universo - a digital cable and satellite network aimed at a Latino audience ages 18–49, formerly known as mun2. 
 Nuvo TV - defunct network targeted at adults between 18 and 49 years of age focusing on English dominant Latinos.
 UniMás – a competing network owned by Univision Communications that also specializes in programming aimed at the 18-34 age demographic as well as reruns of telenovelas and US produced movies dubbed in Spanish.

References

External links
 

Music video networks in the United States
Spanish-language television networks in the United States
Television channels and stations established in 2001